The following lists events that happened during 1883 in Chile.

Incumbents
President of Chile: Domingo Santa María

Events

July
10 July - Battle of Huamachuco

October
20 October - Treaty of Ancón

Unknown
 Ratonera Building

Births
date unknown - Jerónimo Lagos Lisboa (d. 1958)

References 

 
Years of the 19th century in Chile